Harry Freedman (1922–2005) was a Canadian composer, musician and music educator.

Harry Freedman may also refer to:

Harry Freedman (author) (born 1950), author and entrepreneur
Harry Freedman (rabbi) (1901–1982), translator of several major Judaic works
Harry Freedman, character on 55 North Maple

See also
Harry Friedman (born 1946), American television industry executive
Harry Freeman (disambiguation)
Harold Freedman (1915–1999), Australian artist
Henry Freedman